Niko Bretschneider (born 10 August 1999) is a German professional footballer who plays as a left-back for FK Auda.

Career
In the summer of 2020, Bretschneider moved to MSV Duisburg. He made his professional debut for MSV Duisburg in the first round of the 2020–21 DFB-Pokal on 14 September 2020, starting in the home match against Bundesliga side Borussia Dortmund. He made his 3. Liga debut in a 1–1 draw against FSV Zwickau on 26 September 2020. He left Duisburg in the summer of 2022 and joined FK Auda.

Career statistics

References

External links

Niko Bretschneider at kicker.de

1999 births
Living people
Footballers from Berlin
German footballers
Association football fullbacks
Hertha Zehlendorf players
Hertha BSC II players
MSV Duisburg players
FK Auda players
3. Liga players
Regionalliga players
Oberliga (football) players
German expatriate footballers
German expatriate sportspeople in Latvia
Expatriate footballers in Latvia